The D.A.R. State Forest is a state forest located in  Pine County, Minnesota. It is named after the Daughters of the American Revolution and is located east of Banning State Park. There are no facilities in the forest established for outdoor recreation activities, including hiking. Visitors are recommended to stay at nearby Banning State Park, Nemadji State Forest, or General C. C. Andrews State Forest.

See also
List of Minnesota state forests

External links
D.A.R. State Forest - Minnesota Department of Natural Resources (DNR)

References

Minnesota state forests
Protected areas of Pine County, Minnesota
Protected areas established in 1943
Daughters of the American Revolution